Tyrone William Griffin Jr. (born April 13, 1982), known professionally as Ty Dolla Sign (stylized as Ty Dolla $ign or Ty$), is an American singer, songwriter and record producer. He first gained major recognition in 2010 for his feature on American rapper YG's single "Toot It and Boot It". In the summer of 2013, he signed a record deal with American rapper Wiz Khalifa's Taylor Gang Records. In November 2015, he released his debut studio album, Free TC, which peaked at number 14 on the Billboard 200.

Ty Dolla Sign is known for his songs "Paranoid", "Or Nah", and "Blasé"; as well as his writing contributions to "Loyal" by Chris Brown, "Post to Be" by Omarion featuring Brown and Jhené Aiko, and "FourFiveSeconds" by Rihanna, as well his various features on singles such as "Work from Home" by Fifth Harmony, "Swalla" by Jason Derulo, featuring Nicki Minaj, "Hot Girl Summer" by Megan Thee Stallion, also featuring Nicki Minaj, and "Psycho" by Post Malone, which was his first track to hit number one on the Billboard Hot 100 and is certified Diamond by the RIAA. Aside from his solo music career, Ty Dolla Sign is also a member of production team D.R.U.G.S., alongside Chordz 3D, Buddah Shampoo, Nate 3D, James Koo, Fuego and DJ Dahi.

Early life 
Ty Dolla Sign was born Tyrone William Griffin Jr. on April 13, 1982 in Los Angeles, California. He is the son of musician Tyrone Griffin, a member of the band Lakeside. He has said that through his father's involvement in Lakeside, he met singers like Earth, Wind & Fire and Prince as a child, which led to his love and interest for soul music. Growing up in South Central Los Angeles, Ty Dolla Sign was involved in gang activity.

Career

2004–2011: Career beginnings 
Ty Dolla Sign began his music career by learning how to play the bass guitar and later learned how to play drums, guitars, keyboards, and the MPC. Ty Dolla Sign and his writing partner Kory began working together after meeting in New York City in 2004. They were signed to a record deal with Venus Brown and Buddah Brown Entertainment, subsequently releasing a mixtape, titled Raw & Bangin Mixtape Vol 2. The duo also made guest appearances on studio albums by other artists such as Sa-Ra Creative Partners and Black Milk. They also sang on songs such as "U", which was featured on the latter 2007's recording Popular Demand. Eventually, however, the partners had a falling out related to these ventures.

After the dispute, Ty Dolla Sign would go on to collaborate with Los Angeles-based rapper YG. Ty Dolla Sign's initial claim to fame was with the success of YG's single "Toot It and Boot It", a song he both wrote and produced with YG. He then became affiliated with YG's group Pu$haz Ink. In 2011, Ty Dolla Sign released his first solo song, titled "All Star" featuring Joe Moses, and produced by Fuego. Ty Dolla Sign also released his first mixtape "House On The Hill". Then he released "My Cabana", featuring Young Jeezy, which was ranked on Complexs Best 50 Songs of 2012 list at number 23. Ty Dolla Sign co-founded the production team D.R.U.G.S. alongside longtime friends and fellow music producers Chordz 3D and G Casso, the latter of which was later murdered. Other producers later joined D.R.U.G.S., including Nate 3D, Buddah Shampoo, Fuego, DJ Mustard and DJ Dahi.

2012–2014: Beach House mixtapes 

In 2012, Ty Dolla Sign signed a recording contract with Atlantic Records. After signing with Atlantic Records, he released his first solo mixtape, titled Beach House, on October 1, 2012. He followed with the mixtape's sequel, Beach House 2, on July 1, 2013. Beach House 2 features guest appearances from Too Short, Wiz Khalifa, Juicy J and Kirko Bangz, among others. The following day, it was revealed that Ty Dolla Sign signed a deal with Wiz Khalifa's Taylor Gang Records. In mid-2013, he toured with Khalifa and ASAP Rocky, among others, on the "Under the Influence of Music 2" concert tour.

On September 10, 2013, Ty Dolla Sign released a single, titled "Paranoid", which features a verse from Atlanta rapper B.o.B and production from DJ Mustard. The song was later announced to be the first single off his upcoming extended play (EP). On October 22, 2013, the Ethan Lader-directed music video for "Paranoid", premiered via Diddy's Revolt. The single became highly popular, peaking at number 29 on the US Billboard Hot 100 and eventually being certified platinum by the Recording Industry Association of America (RIAA).

On January 7, 2014, Ty Dolla Sign released his second single for his debut EP, titled "Or Nah", featuring Wiz Khalifa and DJ Mustard. The song's production was handled by DJ Mustard and it contains a sample of Trillville's "Some Cut". The music video was filmed during January 2014. The single was remixed featuring vocals from Canadian singer The Weeknd and was later certified triple platinum by the RIAA.

On January 21, 2014, Ty Dolla Sign released his major label debut project, Beach House EP. The EP features guest appearances from Casey Veggies, Wiz Khalifa, Twista, Jay Rock, Trey Songz, French Montana, Travis Scott and Fredo Santana, while the production was primarily handled by Ty Dolla Sign himself, along with DJ Mustard, Cardo and Young Chop, among others. He stated that the EP would feature a new sound from him, and that it would be on a whole other level compared to his mixtapes. Ty Dolla Sign described the EP as being a preview for his debut studio album, at the time due to be released during 2014. The remix to "Paranoid", featuring Trey Songz, French Montana, and DJ Mustard, was also included on the EP.

2014–2016: Free TC and Campaign 

On February 23, 2014, Ty Dolla Sign revealed that his debut studio album would be titled Free TC, and would be released during the third quarter of 2014. He told Revolt, that he had already completed eight songs for the album and that he would be going on tour, namely Under the Influence 3, with Wiz Khalifa during 2014. He was chosen for the 2014's XXL freshman class. In May 2014, Ty Dolla Sign told The Fader, that he would release a mixtape, titled Sign Language, sometime during the next few months, which would then be followed by Free TC. In August 2014, Ty Dolla Sign revealed that Jeremih, Wiz Khalifa, YG, Yo Gotti and Jay 305, will be appearing on Sign Language. On August 24, 2014, which happens to be the same day he released his mixtape Sign Language, Ty Dolla Sign told HotNewHipHop, that he has worked with Rihanna on a track from her upcoming album.

While working on his debut album, Ty Dolla Sign appeared on Chris Brown and Tyga's Fan of a Fan: The Album, on the second track "Nothin' Like Me", as well as Big Sean's song "Play No Games" off of Dark Sky Paradise. On May 26, 2015, Ty Dolla Sign released the first single from Free TC, titled "Only Right", which features TeeCee4800, Joe Moses and YG and was produced by DJ Mustard. On June 26, 2015, he released the album's second single, titled "Blasé", featuring Future and Rae Sremmurd. "Blasé" would go on to be certified platinum by the RIAA. Ty Dolla Sign's album pre-order as well as the instant grat "When I See Ya", featuring Fetty Wap, became available on September 11, 2015. The album's third single, "Saved", featuring E-40, went on to be certified gold by the RIAA.

Ty Dolla Sign revealed that on October 13, 2015, exactly one month before his album came out, he would release a new mixtape Airplane Mode. Ty Dolla Sign's debut album, Free TC, was released on November 13, 2015, via Taylor Gang Records and Atlantic Records. The album debuted at number 14 on the Billboard 200, with 31,000 equivalent album units and first-week sales of 22,000 copies in the United States. In February 2016, Fifth Harmony released the single "Work from Home" featuring Ty Dolla Sign, which has gone on to peak at number 4 on the Billboard Hot 100. In June 2016, Ty Dolla Sign, Lil Wayne, Wiz Khalifa, Imagine Dragons, Logic and X Ambassadors released the collaboration single "Sucker for Pain" for the motion picture soundtrack for Suicide Squad. In August 2016, Ty Dolla Sign and singer Nick Jonas performed the song "Bacon" at the MTV Video Music Awards, where Ty Dolla Sign also won Best Collaboration for "Work from Home" with Fifth Harmony. On September 23, 2016, Ty Dolla Sign released a project titled Campaign, which peaked at number 28 on the Billboard 200.

2016–2018: Beach House 3 and MihTy
On June 19, 2016, Ty Dolla Sign announced that his next project following Campaign would be Beach House 3 and that this installment would be an album rather than a mixtape. The lead single "Love U Better" featuring Lil Wayne and The-Dream was released July 10, 2017. The second single "So Am I" featuring Damian Marley and Skrillex, was released September 1, 2017. The album was released on October 27, 2017, and debuted at number 11 on the Billboard 200.

In February 2018, Ty Dolla Sign was featured on Post Malone's single "Psycho", which peaked at number one on the Billboard Hot 100. In May 2018, he was featured on Christina Aguilera's single "Accelerate" along with 2 Chainz, the first single from Aguilera's eighth album Liberation. On June 1, he was featured on "All Mine" by Kanye West, on West's ye album. On June 8, he was featured on "Freeee (Ghost Town, Pt. 2)" by Kids See Ghosts, on their album Kids See Ghosts. On June 14, he was featured on the Bhad Bhabie single "Trust Me". On June 16, he was featured on "Boss" on Beyoncé and Jay-Z's joint album Everything Is Love. In 2018, he was featured on Tinashe's single "Me So Bad" with French Montana, which had moderate success in Japan, Australia, and New Zealand. He was also featured on Drake's album, Scorpion, He was also featured on the song "After Dark". He also featured on Lecrae's album All Things Work Together on the song "Blessings".

On October 26, 2018, Ty Dolla Sign and Jeremih released a collaborative album under the joint pseudonym MihTy (a portmanteau of both the artists' names) through Def Jam Recordings and Atlantic Records, their respective labels. It was entitled MihTy, and features guest appearances from French Montana, Chris Brown and Wiz Khalifa. The duo had released several singles throughout the fall season of 2018 in anticipation of the album's release, and performed "The Light" on Jimmy Kimmel Live! in the week leading up to the album's debut. The project also contained the hit single "Goin Thru Some Thangs" which reached #15 on the Apple Music top charts.

2019–present: Featuring Ty Dolla Sign and Cheers to the Best Memories 
Ty Dolla Sign released an album preview in February 2019 (via Instagram) featuring a new song produced by D.A. Got That Dope along with a verse from Tyga. On May 20, 2019, Ty Dolla Sign released the single "Purple Emoji", featuring American rapper J. Cole as the intended first single. On August 9, 2019, he released another single titled "Hottest in the City", featuring American rappers Juicy J and Project Pat. He later announced that his third studio album was originally called Tyrone (named from his birth name) and was set to release fall 2019. However, he stated "I had a meeting one time with Kanye, and played him the album, and he was like, 'Bro nah, you need to do what you do. Add more bass, add more drums, add more, the real shit, that's what no one else is doing. Be the best you, bring that shit all the way up to the forefront...That conversation definitely inspired me, and made me go back and go crazy with the live instruments".

On July 1, 2020, Ty Dolla Sign released "Ego Death" featuring Kanye West, FKA Twigs and Skrillex as the official lead single to his third studio album. On July 3, 2020, Ty Dolla Sign announced to Big Boy that his third studio album is called Dream House and would be released "sooner than you think". The second single "Expensive", featuring Nicki Minaj, was released on August 28, 2020. On October 14, Ty Dolla Sign revealed that he changed the album's title to Featuring Ty Dolla Sign, a reference to his work on other artists' projects and songs since his last release. He said the album title came from his gift of collaborating, and features many of his industry friends.

Featuring Ty Dolla Sign was released on October 23, 2020. The album features artists including Kid Cudi, Post Malone, Kanye West, Anderson .Paak, Quavo, Lil Durk, Nicki Minaj, Big Sean, Jhené Aiko, Kehlani, Future, Musiq Soulchild, FKA twigs and Skrillex. Ty Dolla Sign was also featured on the song "Safety Net" with American singer Ariana Grande for her sixth studio album, Positions on October 30, 2020.

On 11 August 2021, Ty Dolla Sign and Canadian R&B duo dvsn, composed of singer Daniel Daley and producer Nineteen85, posted the artwork from a forthcoming collaborative album titled Cheers to the Best Memories to their respective Instagram pages, captioned with the 20 August 2021 release date. The album featured Rauw Alejandro and longtime Ty Dolla Sign associate YG, as well as a posthumous guest appearance from Mac Miller, with whom Ty Dolla Sign had collaborated in the past. The release preceded Ty Dolla Sign's appearances in the following two weeks on "Junya pt 2" from Kanye West's Donda and "Get Along Better" from Drake's Certified Lover Boy.

Artistry

Ty Dolla Sign's sound is a combination of contemporary R&B and hip hop music elements . When asked if he was a rapper, he stated, "People would call it rap, but I really don't feel like I rap. There's so many great rappers, like if we had to battle or some shit, they would just cream me. I don't really consider myself a rapper, I just happen to have bars, or something like that. I still sing man, I'm a singer, ya feel me?"

He cited Nate Dogg and Chris Brown as main influences for his musical style. When asked about his influences, Ty Dolla Sign responded, "2Pac is my favorite artist of all time. I liked Slum Village a lot back then, like J Dilla, he's one of my favorite producers and artists. I'm like a hip-hop head type of dude. Mos Def, Talib Kweli, that whole Rawkus Records scene, that's my type of shit." He continued, "I also like cats like Prince. Just like his production, he's kind of like the same thing as me. He sings, he produces, he plays all types of instruments. That's what I'm after. I wouldn't wear that type of clothes or wear my hair like that. [Laughs.] But as far as artistry, that's the same type of dude I am." In an interview he revealed that Kim Burrell was his absolute favorite vocalist, and that Brandy was right there with her.

Personal life
Ty Dolla Sign has a daughter named Jailynn Crystal. He was in a relationship with Fifth Harmony member Lauren Jauregui from 2017 to 2019.

On December 10, 2018, it was revealed that Ty Dolla Sign was facing up to fifteen years in jail in relation to cocaine and marijuana possession charges. These charges resulted from a traffic stop in Atlanta, Georgia where in a car with multiple people, Ty Dolla Sign was the only one charged with the drugs due to him being in close proximity to them. Later, all charges were dropped upon completion of a drug prevention program.

In 2020, Ty Dolla Sign formally endorsed the presidential campaign of fellow musician and frequent collaborator Kanye West.

Discography 

Studio albums
Free TC (2015)
Beach House 3 (2017)
Featuring Ty Dolla Sign (2020)

Filmography

Television

Awards and nominations

References

External links

1982 births
Living people
African-American record producers
African-American  male singer-songwriters
American contemporary R&B singers
Bloods
American hip hop record producers
American hip hop singers
Atlantic Records artists
Record producers from California
Singers from Los Angeles
West Coast hip hop musicians
21st-century African-American male singers
Singer-songwriters from California